Dickersonville is a hamlet  in the town of Lewiston in Niagara County, New York, United States.

References

Lewiston (town), New York
Hamlets in New York (state)
Hamlets in Niagara County, New York